Mikal Kirkholt (9 December 1920 – 28 June 2012) was a Norwegian cross-country skier.

He represented the club IL Troll. At the 1952 Winter Olympics in Oslo he finished twelfth in the 18 kilometres and won a silver medal in the 4 × 10 km relay. He retired after the Olympics, to marry and work in Sunndal, but later returned to live and work at the family farm in Rindal.

Cross-country skiing results

Olympic Games
 1 medal – (1 silver)

References

1920 births
2012 deaths
People from Rindal
Norwegian male cross-country skiers
Olympic cross-country skiers of Norway
Cross-country skiers at the 1952 Winter Olympics
Olympic silver medalists for Norway
Olympic medalists in cross-country skiing
Medalists at the 1952 Winter Olympics
Sportspeople from Møre og Romsdal